Laplink (sometimes styled LapLink) was a proprietary piece of software developed by Mark Eppley and sold by Traveling Software, which is now LapLink Software, Inc. First available in 1983, LapLink was used to synchronize, copy, or move, files between two PCs, in an era before local area networks, using the parallel port and a LapLink cable or serial port and a null modem cable or USB and a USB adhoc network cable. 

LapLink was the predecessor to Laplink PCmover.

LapLink typically shipped with a LapLink cable to link two PCs together, enabling the transfer of files from one PC to the other using the LapLink software.

References

Backup software
File transfer software